I Stole Your Animal is the first full-length album by Care Bears on Fire. It was released October 4, 2007, on Daisy Explosion Records. The band was in middle school when the album was released.

Critical reception
PopMatters called the album "cheerful garage pop-punk," writing that it was "not entirely without charm." SFGate called it "rough-around-the-edges, early-style American punk." The Austin Chronicle wrote that Care Bears on Fire "shred precociously on smart, snappy songs like 'Met You on MySpace.'"

Track listing
All tracks were written by Care Bears on Fire.

References

2007 albums
Care Bears on Fire albums